Gajevi may refer to:

 Gajevi (Šamac), a village in Bosnia and Herzegovina
 Gajevi (Brčko), a village in Bosnia and Herzegovina
 Gajevi (Ilijaš), a village in Bosnia and Herzegovina